Anas Basboussi, known artistically as Bawss, is a Moroccan actor and rapper. He is best known for his role in Nabil Ayouch's 2021 film Casablanca Beats, which was selected to compete for the Palme d'Or at the 2021 Cannes Film Festival.

External links

References 

Date of birth missing (living people)
Living people
Moroccan male film actors
21st-century Moroccan male actors
21st-century Moroccan male musicians
Moroccan rappers
Year of birth missing (living people)